Kaiser Aminpour (1959-2007) was an Iranian poet. Aminpour was one of the several distinguished poets who can be considered the founder of post-Revolution Iranian poetry.

Biography
Aminpour was born in Gatvand near Dezful, the provincial capital of Iran's Khuzestan Province. He completed early education in Dezful before leaving for the capital Tehran, where he intended to study veterinary medicine at the University of Tehran. However, he abandoned this plan and enrolled into social sciences in 1978.

References

2007 deaths
20th-century Iranian poets
Members of the Academy of Persian Language and Literature
1959 births
20th-century poets
Iranian Science and Culture Hall of Fame recipients in Literature and Culture
Iran's Book of the Year Awards recipients
Faculty of Letters and Humanities of the University of Tehran alumni
21st-century Iranian poets
People from Dezful